Adisak Klinkosoom (born August 18, 1993) is a Thai professional footballer who plays as a defensive midfielder.

Honours

Club
Muangthong United
 Thai League 1 (2): 2010
Chiangrai United
 Thai League Cup (1): 2018
 Thai FA Cup (1): 2018

External links
 Profile at Goal

1993 births
Living people
Adisak Klinkosoom
Adisak Klinkosoom
Association football midfielders
Adisak Klinkosoom
Adisak Klinkosoom
Adisak Klinkosoom
Adisak Klinkosoom